The Louisville, Paducah and Southwestern Railroad was a 19th-century railway company in western Kentucky in the United States. It later made up part of the Illinois Central network and its former rights-of-way currently form parts of the class-II Paducah and Louisville Railway.

It connected with the Owensboro and Russellville Railroad and the later Evansville, Owensboro and Nashville Railroad (both subsequently part of the L&N network) at Central City in Muhlenberg County.

See also
 List of Kentucky railroads

Defunct Kentucky railroads
Defunct companies based in Louisville, Kentucky
Transportation in Louisville, Kentucky
Railway companies established in 1874
Railway companies disestablished in 1876
1874 establishments in Kentucky
American companies established in 1874